The 2015–16 season is Maccabi Haifa's 58th season in Israeli Premier League, and their 34th consecutive season in the top division of Israeli football.

Club

Kits

 Provider: Nike, Inc.
 Main Sponsor: Honda
 Secondary Sponsor:  Pointer and Variety Israel

Squad information

Current coaching staff

{|class="wikitable"
|+
! style="background-color:white; color:black;" scope="col"|Position
! style="background-color:white; color:black;" scope="col"|Staff
|-

Transfers

Transfers in

Total expenditure: €600,000

Transfers out

Total revenue: €500,000

Players out on loan

Pre-season and friendlies

Competitions

Overall

Updated as of 25 May 2016

Overview

Updated as of 25 May 2016

Ligat Ha'Al

Regular season

Regular season table

Play-off

Championship round table

Results summary

Results by round

State Cup

Round of 32

Round of 16

Quarter final

Semi final

Final

Toto Cup

Group stage

Knockout phase

Quarter-final

Statistics

Squad statistics

Updated on 25 May 2016

Goals

Updated on 25 May 2016

Assists

Updated on 25 May 2016

Clean sheets

Last updated on 25 May 2016

Disciplinary record (Ligat Ha'Al and State Cup)

Last updated on 25 May 2016

Disciplinary record (Toto Cup)

Penalties for

Updated on 27 February 2016

Overall

Updated on 25 May 2016 

{| class="wikitable" style="text-align: center"
|-
!
!Total
!Home
!Away
!Natural
|-
|align=left| Games played          || 48 || 24 || 22 || 2
|-
|align=left| Games won             || 23 || 13 || 8 || 2
|-
|align=left| Games drawn          || 13 || 6 || 7 || 0
|-
|align=left| Games lost           || 12 || 5 || 7 || 0 
|-
|align=left| Biggest win           || 4 – 0 vs Hapoel Akko 4 – 0 vs Maccabi Petah Tikva || 4 – 0 vs Hapoel Akko 4 – 0 vs Maccabi Petah Tikva || 3 – 0 vs Hapoel Tel Aviv 3 – 0 vs Maccabi Netanya || 3 – 1 vs Hapoel Be'er Sheva
|-
|align=left| Biggest loss     || 0 – 6 Maccabi Tel Aviv || 0 – 3 vs Bnei Yehuda Tel Aviv || 0 – 6 Maccabi Tel Aviv ||
|-
|align=left| Biggest win (League)  || 4 – 0 vs Hapoel Akko || 4 – 0 vs Hapoel Akko ||  3-0 vs Hapoel Tel Aviv 3 – 0 vs Maccabi Netanya || N/A
|-
|align=left| Biggest loss (League) || 0 – 6 Maccabi Tel Aviv || 0-3 vs Bnei Yehuda Tel Aviv || 0 – 6 Maccabi Tel Aviv ||N/A
|-
|align=left| Biggest win (Cup)    || 4 – 1 vs Bnei Yehuda Tel Aviv || 4 – 1 vs Bnei Yehuda Tel Aviv  || – ||  3 – 1 vs Hapoel Be'er Sheva
|-
|align=left| Biggest loss (Cup)    || - || - || - || - 
|-
|align=left| Biggest win (Toto)   || 3 – 0 vs Hapoel Akko || 3 – 0 vs Hapoel Akko ||   1 – 0 vs Bnei Sakhnin 2-1 vs Ironi Kiryat Shmona ||
|-
|align=left| Biggest loss (Toto) || 0 – 1 vs Maccabi Petah Tikva || 0 – 1 vs Maccabi Petah Tikva ||  ||
|-
|align=left| Clean sheets          || 19 || 11 || 7 || 1
|-
|align=left| Goals scored         || 67 || 36 || 27 || 4
|-
|align=left| Goals conceded      || 51 || 18 || 32 || 1
|-
|align=left| Goal difference       || +16 || +18 || -5 || +3
|-
|-
|-
|align=left| Yellow cards       || 132 || 56 || 68 || 8
|-
|align=left| Red cards            || 9 || 4 || 5 ||
|-
|align=left| Most appearances     || align=left| Dekel Keinan (42) || colspan=4|–
|-
|align=left| Most minutes played  || align=left| Dekel Keinan (3,709) || colspan=4|–
|-
|align=left| Most goals           || align=left| Glynor Plet (15)  || colspan=4|–
|-
|align=left|Penalties for || 8 || 1 || 7 ||
|-
|align=left|Penalties against || 9 || 3 || 6 ||
|-
|align=left| Winning rate        || % || % || % || %

References

External links
 Maccabi Haifa website

Maccabi Haifa F.C. seasons
Maccabi Haifa